Jadavpur Sammilita Balika Vidyalaya or Jadavpur Sammilita Girls' High School is a school located at Baghajatin, Kolkata, India.

History
This is a girls' school and was established in 1952. The school is affiliated to the West Bengal Board of Secondary Education for Madhyamik Pariksha (10th Board exams), and to the West Bengal Council of Higher Secondary Education for Higher Secondary Examination (12th Board exams).

See also
Education in India
List of schools in India
Education in West Bengal

References

External links

High schools and secondary schools in West Bengal
Girls' schools in Kolkata
Educational institutions established in 1952
1952 establishments in West Bengal